Miami is the second studio album by American rock band The Gun Club, released in 1982. It was released on Animal Records, founded by guitarist Chris Stein of Blondie. Stein also produced the album.

Debbie Harry, also of Blondie, appears as a backing singer on various tracks on the album under the pseudonym "D.H. Laurence Jr." The album front cover photograph doesn't include bassist Rob Ritter who had already left the band. Before leaving, Ritter first taught all the bass-lines to Patricia Morrison, his replacement in the Gun Club and former bandmate in the Bags.

Billy Idol had met up with Pierce in an L.A. bar around the time of Miami and later revealed his commercial hit "White Wedding" had been an attempt to emulate "Mother of Earth" from the album. The song was covered by alt-country band The Sadies on their 2001 album Tremendous Efforts and also by Swedish band bob hund, but with lyrics in Swedish, as “Mamma din jord” on their 2019 album 0-100.

Reception
Miami was ranked among the top fifty "Albums of the Year" for 1982 by NME.

Track listing
All songs written by Jeffrey Lee Pierce; except as indicated.
Side one
 "Carry Home" - 3:14
 "Like Calling Up Thunder" - 2:29
 "Brother and Sister" - 2:57
 "Run Through the Jungle" (John Fogerty) - 4:07
 "A Devil in the Woods" - 3:05
 "Texas Serenade" - 4:40

Side two
 "Watermelon Man" (Ward Dotson, Jeffrey Lee Pierce) - 4:11
 "Bad Indian" - 2:37
 "John Hardy" (Traditional; arranged by Jeffrey Lee Pierce) - 3:21
 "Fire of Love" (Jody Reynolds, Stordivant Sonya) - 2:14
 "Sleeping in Blood City" - 3:29
 "Mother of Earth" - 3:21

Personnel

The Gun Club
Jeffrey Lee Pierce - vocals, guitar, piano, background vocals on "Watermelon Man", lead guitar on "Run Through the Jungle", "John Hardy" and "Mother of Earth"
Ward Dotson - lead guitar, background vocals on "Watermelon Man"
Rob Ritter - bass
Terry Graham - drums

Additional musicians
D.H. Laurence, Jr. - backing vocals
Walter Steding - fiddle on "Watermelon Man"
Chris Stein - producer, bongos on "Watermelon Man"
Mark Tomeo - steel guitar on "Texas Serenade" and "Mother of Earth"

Production
Joe Arlotta - session engineer
Butch Jones - mixing engineer
Chris D. - cover photographs, original design

"Special thanks to: Bob Singerman, Linda Cuckovich, Chris D., Robyn Weiss, Lois Graham, Lux Interior, Ivy Rorschach, Kid Congo, Linda Jones, Chris Stein and D.H. Laurence, Jr."

References

External links

1982 albums
The Gun Club albums
Chrysalis Records albums
I.R.S. Records albums
Cooking Vinyl albums